Hay Island is a 10 ha coral cay that is part of the Great Barrier Reef Marine Park west of Cape Melville, Queensland, Australia.  It lies east of Coen in the Claremont Isles.  It is part of the Islands North of Port Stewart Important Bird Area. It is around 42 hectares or 0.42 square km in size.

References

Islands on the Great Barrier Reef
Important Bird Areas of Queensland
Islands of Far North Queensland
Uninhabited islands of Australia
Places in the Great Barrier Reef Marine Park